Mario Lertora (September 21, 1897 – March 28, 1939) was an Italian artistic gymnast who competed in the 1924 Summer Olympics, in the 1928 Summer Olympics, and in the 1932 Summer Olympics.

In 1924 he was a member of the Italian team which won the gold medal in the team all-around event. In the 1924 Summer Olympics, he also participated in the following events:

 parallel bars - fifth place
 all-around - tenth place
 rope climbing - tenth place
 horizontal bar - twelfth place
 rings - 15th place
 pommel horse - 29th place
 sidehorse vault - 32nd place
 vault - 34th place

In 1932 he was part of the Italian team which won the gold medal in the team all-around event. He also won a bronze medal in the floor competition.

In the 1932 Summer Olympics he also participated in the following events:

 all-around - fourth place
 parallel bars - fifth place
 vault - eighth place

References

External links
 

1897 births
1939 deaths
Sportspeople from Genoa
Italian male artistic gymnasts
Olympic gymnasts of Italy
Gymnasts at the 1924 Summer Olympics
Gymnasts at the 1928 Summer Olympics
Gymnasts at the 1932 Summer Olympics
Olympic gold medalists for Italy
Olympic bronze medalists for Italy
Olympic medalists in gymnastics
Medalists at the 1932 Summer Olympics
Medalists at the 1924 Summer Olympics